Enigmata or Aenigmata may refer to:

 Enigmata (album), by John Zorn
 Enigmata, one hundred (hexa)metrical riddles by Aldhelm
 Enigmata, a collection of riddles by Saint Boniface
 Aenigmata, a collection of riddles by Symphosius
 Enigmata Tatwini, a collection of riddles by Tatwine
 Enigmata Eusebii, a collection of riddles by someone called Eusebius

See also

 Enigma (disambiguation)